FC Ravda 1954 is a Bulgarian football club from the village of Ravda nearby city Nesebar, which currently competes in the A RFG, the fourth tier of the Bulgarian football league pyramid.

History
The club was originally established in 1954 but after a few years was dissolved. In 2009 OFC Chernomorets Nesebar was relocated in Ravda, renamed as FC Ravda 1954 and was named as a successor of the former FC Ravda. The biggest success in the club's history came in 2010, when the team earned promotion to the Bulgarian B PFG by decisively winning the South-East V AFG. The club's home ground is the Municipal Stadium in Ravda, which has a capacity for 2,000 spectators, but the team plays its home matches at Nesebar due to renovation at stadium. On October 20 Ravda 1954 withdrew from Eastern B PFG.

Honours
South-East V AFG
Champions 2009-10
Cup of Bulgarian Amateur Football League
Winners 2009-10

References

External links 
 Ravda 1954 at bgclubs.eu

Ravda
1954 establishments in Bulgaria